Joseph Sullivan (1 February 1877 – 10 July 1935) was an Australian rules footballer who played with Carlton in the Victorian Football League (VFL).

Sullivan had played for both Rutherglen and Port Melbourne by the time he arrived at Carlton. He was Carlton's leading goal-kicker in three of his four seasons, with 18 goals in 1900, 14 goals in 1901 and 27 goals in 1903. The only year he didn't top the goal-kicking was in 1902 season, when he was club captain before getting injured. He represented Victoria in 1903.

References

External links

 
 
 Joe Sullivan at The VFA Project.

1877 births
1935 deaths
Australian rules footballers from Victoria (Australia)
Australian Rules footballers: place kick exponents
Carlton Football Club players
Port Melbourne Football Club players
Rutherglen Football Club players